Dean Collis (born 21 October 1985 in Campbelltown, New South Wales, Australia) is an Australian former professional rugby league footballer who last played for the Camden Rams in the Group 6 Rugby League Competition, primarily as a .

Career
Collis played his junior football with the Campbelltown Warriors. While attending Patrician Brothers Fairfield, Collis played for the Australian Schoolboys team in 2003.

Making his début with Wests Tigers in 2003, Collis played 8 games until the end of the 2005 season.  As NRL Premiers Wests faced Super League champions Bradford Bulls in the 2006 World Club Challenge. Collis played at centre in the Tigers' 30-10 loss. By 2006, Collis was a regular starter in the centres, playing in every game of the 2006 and 2007 seasons, and winning a spot in the City team. His remaining 2 seasons with Wests Tigers were hampered by injury.

In July, 2009, it was announced that Collis had signed a two-year deal to play with the Cronulla-Sutherland Sharks from the 2010 NRL season.

In September 2011 Collis signed a deal that saw him join the Super League playing for Wakefield Trinity until 2015.

On 11 June 2015 it was announced that Collis would be leaving Wakefield Trinity with immediate effect as he had a desire to return home due to family reasons.

Career highlights
First Grade Debut: 2003, Round 25 - Wests Tigers v North Queensland Cowboys, Campbelltown Stadium, 31 August
50th First Grade game: Round 19, 22 July 2007, scoring a try in the seventh minute.

References

External links
Cronulla Sharks profile
Dean Collis at NRL.com
Dean Collis at Wests Tigers
Dean Collis at the Rugby League Project

1985 births
Living people
Australian rugby league players
Australian expatriate sportspeople in England
Cronulla-Sutherland Sharks players
New South Wales City Origin rugby league team players
Rugby league centres
Rugby league players from Sydney
Wakefield Trinity players
Wests Tigers players